The 2014 Italian local elections were held on  25 May, with a second round on 8 June. In Italy, direct elections were held in 4,086 municipalities: in each municipality (comune) were chosen mayor and members of the City Council. Of the 4,086 municipalities, 29 were provincial capitals and 243 had a population higher than 15,000 inhabitants (10,000 for Sicily).

Municipal councilors and mayors ordinarily serve a terms of five years.

Voting System
All mayoral elections in Italy in cities with a population higher than 15,000 use the same system. Under this system voters express a direct choice for the mayor or an indirect choice voting for one of the parties of the candidate's coalition. If no candidate receives a majority of votes, the top two candidates go to a second round after two weeks. The coalition of the elected mayor is guaranteed a majority of seats in the council with the attribution of extra seats.

The City Council is elected at the same time as the mayor. Voters can vote for a list of candidates and can express up to two preferences for candidates of said list. In case of two preferences, they must be given to candidates of both genders. Seats are the attributed to parties proportionally, and for each party the candidates with the highest number of preferences are elected.

Results

Coalition results
Majority of each coalition in 243 municipalities (comuni) with a population higher than 15,000:

Party results
Party votes in 29 provincial capital municipalities:

Mayoral election results

City councils

Notes

2014 elections in Italy
 
 
Municipal elections in Italy
May 2014 events in Italy
June 2014 events in Italy